Moscow is an unincorporated community in Polk County, Texas, United States. As of the year 2000, the community had approximately 170 residents.

Geography
Moscow is at the junction of U.S. Highway 59 and Farm to Market Road 350, ninety miles north of Houston in central Polk County.

History
David and Matilda Green first settled the area in the 1840s. The first post office was established in 1847 under Green's name. The community's name was changed to Moscow, after Moscow, Russia, in 1853 as the postal authorities deemed the proposed name of Greenville as being too similar to Greensboro, Texas. The First Baptist Church was established in 1849. Moscow became a trading center for Polk County farmers during the latter 1850s and a stage stop on the Liberty-Nacogdoches Road, with cotton gins, shops, saloons and a hotel.

The town was noted for its school, the Moscow Masonic Academy (or Moscow Masonic High School depending on source). Built in 1853 as the Moscow Masonic Male and Female Academy, the institution served the community under its latter name from 1857. Future Texas Governor William P. Hobby attended the school. The school burned down around 1935.

The Houston, East and West Texas Railway reached the town in 1880 followed by the seven-mile long Moscow, Camden and San Augustine Railroad in 1899, one of the shortest railroads in Texas. A mule-drawn streetcar line linked the train station with the business district. 

Sawmills in Moscow supported the burgeoning logging industry. A cannery for vegetables and fruit and a column factory (making architectural columns) were early industries in the town that helped diversify Moscow's economy.

In 1880, with an estimated 228 residents, Moscow was the largest town in Polk County. By 1900 its population had reached 263. By the 1920s, the lumber supply in East Texas began to dwindle due to overharvesting. Coupled with the Great Depression, many lumber companies left the area, as well as many farmers going bankrupt due to the economic conditions. With the decline of logging and agriculture, Moscow's population began to decline also and per 2000 census was 170. 

Its a small peaceful quiet town with Hobby Park, Big Jakes restaurant and Kundi Ranch (est 2018), on US Hwy 59.

Education
Moscow is served by Corrigan-Camden Independent School District.

Notable people
 William P. Hobby, publisher of the Houston Post and the 27th Governor of the U.S. state of Texas from 1917 to 1921.

References

External links

 

Unincorporated communities in Texas
Unincorporated communities in Polk County, Texas